Campo de Borja is a comarca (district) in Aragon, Spain. It is located in the province of Zaragoza, in a transition area between the Iberian System of mountain ranges and the Ebro Valley. Its capital is Borja.

It is a wine-producing comarca, famous for its Campo de Borja wines, both red and white.

Municipalities

Agón
Ainzón
Alberite de San Juan
Albeta
Ambel
Bisimbre
Borja
Bulbuente
Bureta
Fréscano
Fuendejalón
Magallón
Maleján
Mallén
Novillas
Pozuelo de Aragón
Tabuenca
Talamantes

References

External links 
Official website 

 
Comarcas of Aragon
Geography of the Province of Zaragoza